Wolf Creek is an Australian horror web television series which screens on Stan. The series is a spin-off of the movies Wolf Creek and Wolf Creek 2. John Jarratt, who portrayed Mick Taylor in the films, reprises his role for the show.

The first season of Wolf Creek consisted of six episodes and was released on 12 May 2016. It follows Eve, a 19-year-old American tourist, who is targeted by the crazed serial killer Mick Taylor, but survives his attack and embarks on a mission of revenge. The show was renewed for a second season of six episodes in February 2017, which was released on 15 December 2017. The story centres around Taylor meeting a coach full of international tourists.

Cast

Season 1

Main
 Lucy Fry as Eve Thorogood
 Dustin Clare as Sullivan Hill
 John Jarratt as Mick Taylor

Recurring and guest
 Deborah Mailman as Bernadette O'Dell
 Maya Stange as Ingrid Thorogood
 Damian De Montemas as Inspector Darwin
 Miranda Tapsell as Fatima Johnson
 Robert Taylor as Roland Thorogood
 Matt Levett as Kevin Small
 Richard Cawthorne as Kane Jurkewitz
 Rachel House as Ruth Ngata
 Jessica Tovey as Kirsty Hill
 Eddie Baroo as Ginger Jurkewitz
 Alicia Gardiner as Janine Howard
 Fletcher Humphrys as Jesus (Ben Mitchell)
 Liana Cornell as Ann-Marie

Season 2

Main
 Tess Haubrich as Rebecca Michaels
 Matt Day as Brian
 John Jarratt as Mick Taylor

Recurring and guest
 Felicity Price as Nina Webber
 Julian Pulvermacher as Oskar Webber
 Jason Chong as Steve Cham
 Adam Fiorentino as Johnny Rossi
 Charlie Clausen as Danny Michaels
 Christopher Kirby as Bruce Walker
 Laura Wheelwright as Kelly Yeoman
 Elsa Cocquerel as Michelle Scott
 Josephine Langford as Emma Webber
 Elijah Williams as Wade Cheti
 Ben Oxenbould as Ian "Davo" Davidson
 Stephen Hunter as Richie
 Chris Haywood as Tom
 Cohen McRae as Danny

Episodes

Season 1 (2016)

Season 2 (2017)

Production 
In October 2016, Jarratt suggested that Wolf Creek would be returning for a second season and a later film. Stan officially announced that Wolf Creek had been renewed in February 2017 and would be released in late 2017. Filming began in South Australia in July 2017. The six-episode second season saw John Jarratt reprise his role as Mick Taylor, alongside new cast members Tess Haubrich, Matt Day, Ben Oxenbould, Laura Wheelwright, Stephen Hunter and Chris Haywood. The story centres around Taylor meeting a coach full of international tourists – a complete departure from the first season's storyline which sees the show become an anthology style program, and won't see Fry reprise her role as Eve Thorogood. The second season was released on 15 December 2017.

Greg McLean returned as showrunner and director, along with Kieran Darcy-Smith and Geoff Bennett. Lisa Scott and Kerrie Mainwaring were producers for the series. Executive producers were Rory Callaghan, Greg Haddrick, Greg McLean, Nick Forward and Rob Gibson. Writers on the series were Nick Parsons, Shanti Gudgeon and Mark Dapin.

Reception
The series has received generally positive reviews. Nikole Gunn of Decider TV wrote, "It’s beautifully filmed with cinematography usually reserved for the 'Big Screen'" and that "It's chilling and unforgettable". David Knox of TV Tonight awarded the premiere four out of five stars and wrote, "If there's a box Wolf Creek hasn’t got checked, it's hard to find here".

Within the first four days of the first season being made available, more than 500,000 viewers sampled the program, including 40,000 subscribers who watched all six episodes.

Broadcast
Broadcast rights for Wolf Creek in North American and Latin American markets were acquired by Lionsgate, and the show aired in the United States albeit for a limited time from 14 October to 18 November 2016 on the Pop network which Lionsgate held a stake in at the time.  In the UK, the series aired on Fox in August 2016.

Third Series

As of December 2022, there has been no announcement of a third series.

Awards and nominations

References

External links
 

2016 Australian television series debuts
2017 Australian television series endings
Australian horror fiction television series
English-language television shows
Television series by Screentime
Live action television shows based on films
Serial killers in television
Stan (service) original programming